The 1970 United States Senate election in Hawaii took place on November 3, 1970. Incumbent Republican Senator Hiram Fong was narrowly re-elected to a third term in office, narrowly defeating Democratic businessman Cecil Heftel. 

According to the Honolulu Star-Bulletin, Fong's support for the Vietnam War led to his close-call in the 1970 election.

Democratic primary

Candidates
Neil Abercrombie, taxi driver, future U.S. Representative and Governor
Cecil Heftel, owner of Heftel Broadcasting, a radio conglomerate
Tony Hodges, environmental activist

Results

General election

Results

See also 
 1970 United States Senate elections

References 

Hawaii
1970
1970 Hawaii elections